Eric Carl Bauman (born December 10, 1958) is an American political operative who was, until 2018, the chair of the California Democratic Party. Previously the vice chair of the state party (2009–2017) and chair of the Los Angeles Democratic Party (2000–2017), he is known for his influence in Los Angeles County Democratic politics. He announced his resignation as head of the California Democratic Party on November 29, 2018, following sexual misconduct allegations.

Early life and education
Born in The Bronx, New York, Bauman worked as a registered nurse for many years before entering politics. He obtained his bachelor's degree in nursing from Excelsior College. He also obtained graduate education in health care administration from Century University, now known as American Century University, an unaccredited, for-profit university based in Albuquerque, New Mexico.

Political influence
Bauman was chair of the California Democratic Party, the largest state Democratic Party entity in the United States.

Bauman has been referred to as a "kingmaker" in Los Angeles County Democratic politics by LA Weekly. In the article he claimed, "I don't make promises or ask people to do things in a quid pro quo format. That would be against the law."

Under his leadership, the Los Aangeles Democratic Party was awarded 15 Pollie Awards and three Reed Awards.

Bauman is regularly quoted by the Los Angeles Times and often appears on CNN and KTTV Fox 11 News on issues relating to Los Angeles County and California Democratic politics. Bauman also makes regular monthly appearances on Charter Communications' California Edition.

He is a senior adviser to the speaker of the California State Assembly, Anthony Rendon, and was previously for John Pérez and Toni Atkins, in addition to having been Governor Gray Davis' Southern California director, and having been Deputy Insurance Commissioner under then-Insurance Commissioner John Garamendi.

Before attending the 2016 Democratic National Convention as a PLEO delegate, Bauman was featured in a special edition of KNBCLA's News Conference with Conan Nolan.

Bauman put in a bid to be chair of the California Democratic Party in 2017, defeating his opponent Kimberly Ellis.

On May 20, 2017, he was elected chair of the California Democratic Party at the annual state convention. He was the first openly gay person and the first Jew to be chair of the party.

Controversy 
On November 29, 2018, Bauman resigned from his position as chair of the California Democratic Party after lawsuits alleged that he committed sexual harassment, discrimination and sexual assault. These included allegations by Bauman's assistant, William Floyd, that "Bauman forcibly performed oral sex on him several times and that the party failed to respond appropriately to Bauman’s behavior". In his lawsuit, "Floyd alleges Bauman threatened him, telling him "if you cross me, I will break you.""

The lawsuits were settled in 2020 for nearly $3 million.

Personal life 
He lives in North Hollywood with his husband of many years, Michael. His uncle is the musician Jon "Bowzer" Bauman, formerly of Sha Na Na.

In November 2018, the California Democratic Party vice chairman, Daraka Larimore-Hall, filed a complaint accusing Bauman of having sexually assaulted or harassed Larimore-Hall's staff members.

Pharmaceutical consulting
Bauman has been criticized for his ties to California's pharmaceutical industry. He lobbied against Proposition 61 which would have prohibited the state from buying drugs that are more expensive than the price the Department of Veterans Affairs pays. This criticism re-emerged following his election to become chair of the California Democratic Party.

References

External links
Eric C. Bauman personal website
Meet the Chair Los Angeles County Democratic Party
Officers California Democratic Party

1958 births
Living people
American nurses
Gay politicians
Jewish American people in California politics
California Democratic Party chairs
Gay Jews
Politicians from Los Angeles
People from the Bronx
21st-century American Jews